In the 2021–22 season, Partizan NIS Belgrade competed in the Serbian League, Radivoj Korać Cup, Adriatic League and EuroCup.

Players

Current roster

Players with multiple nationalities
   Kevin Punter
    Tristan Vukčević
   Dallas Moore

Depth chart

On loan

Roster changes

In

|}

Out

|}

Pre-season and friendlies

Liburnia Cup

Istanball Cup

Giannakopoulos Cup

Adriatic League

Regular season

Matches

Semifinals

Finals

EuroCup

Regular season

Standings

Matches

Knockout phase

Radivoj Korać Cup

Serbian League

On 9 June 2022, Partizan announced withdrawal from the 2022 Serbian League playoffs following numerous fan incidents in the 2022 ABA League Finals. Following their withdrawal, their semifinals opponent FMP Meridian advanced to the Finals.

Individual awards

Adriatic League

MVP of the Round

 Yam Madar – Round 5
 Zach LeDay – Round 25
 Zach LeDay – Semifinal Game 2
 Kevin Punter – Semifinal Game 3
 Kevin Punter – Final Game 3
 Aleksa Avramović – Final Game 4
 Kevin Punter – Final Game 5

The Ideal Starting Five

 Kevin Punter – PG  
 Zach LeDay – PF 

Coach of the Season

 Željko Obradović

EuroCup

MVP of the Round

 Mathias Lessort – Round 13
 Zach LeDay – Round 18

EuroCup Second Team

 Kevin Punter

References

KK Partizan seasons
Partizan
Partizan
KK Partizan